St. Michael's Episcopal Church, or variants thereof, may refer to:

United States
 St. Michael's Episcopal Church (Anaheim, California)
 St. Michael's Church (Manhattan), New York City, listed on the National Register of Historic Places
 St. Michael's Episcopal Church, Trenton, New Jersey, now St. Michael's Church, listed on the National Register of Historic Places
St. Michael and All Angels Episcopal Church (Cincinnati, Ohio)
 St. Michael's Episcopal Church (Birdsboro, Pennsylvania)
St. Michael's Episcopal Church (Charleston, South Carolina), a National Historic Landmark
St. Michael's Churchyard, Charleston, South Carolina

Scotland
St Michael's Episcopal Church (Edinburgh), in Edinburgh

See also
 Michaelion
 St. Michael's Church (disambiguation)